Ahmed Said Ahmed (born 4 July 1998) is a Somali professional footballer who plays for VJS as a defender.

Club career
In 2015, Said Ahmed joined PK-35 Vantaa after playing in VJS's youth academy. Said Ahmed made one appearance for PK-35 in the 2015 Ykkönen, as the club gained promotion to the Veikkausliiga. Ahmed made ten appearances for PK-35  in the 2016 Veikkausliiga, as the club were relegated back to the Ykkönen. During the 2017 Ykkönen season, Said Ahmed played for IF Gnistan and Grankulla IFK, making four and two appearances respectively. Ahead of the 2018 season, Said Ahmed signed for Kakkonen club NJS, making eight first team league appearances for the club. On 26 January 2019, Said Ahmed made a solitary appearance for AC Kajaani in a 4–1 Finnish Cup defeat against KTP, before joining VJS.

International career
On 5 September 2019, Said Ahmed made his debut for Somalia in a 1–0 win against Zimbabwe, marking Somalia's first ever FIFA World Cup qualification victory.

Personal life
Ahmed Said Ahmed is the brother of the footballer Abdulkadir Said Ahmed and the politician Suldaan Said Ahmed.

He holds Finnish citizenship.

References

External links
 
 

1998 births
Living people
Association football central defenders
Somalian footballers
Somalia international footballers
Somalian Muslims
Somalian emigrants to Finland
Naturalized citizens of Finland
Finnish footballers
Finnish people of Somali descent
Veikkausliiga players
PK-35 Vantaa (men) players
Ykkönen players
IF Gnistan players
Grankulla IFK players
Kakkonen players
Sportspeople from Jeddah
Nurmijärven Jalkapalloseura players
AC Kajaani players